Malcolm Goldie (born 1883 in Duntocher, Scotland) was a Scottish-American soccer outside left who began his career in Scotland before moving to American Soccer League in 1922.  He earned one cap with the U.S. national team in 1925.  He also coached the MIT soccer team from 1933 to 1941.

Playing

Scotland
Goldie began his professional career with Scottish Football League clubs Clyde, St Bernard's and latterly Clydebank. At the time the club played in the Second Division, but during World War I, the loss of players to the military led to the disbandment of the lower division and Clydebank played in the Western League. However, in 1917 they were invited into the remaining top division (in place of clubs which had withdrawn due to wartime travel difficulties) where they remained until relegated following the 1921–22 season. At that point, Goldie left the club and moved to the United States where he signed with Bethlehem Steel of the American Soccer League (ASL).

ASL
In 1922, Goldie began his U.S. career with Bethlehem Steel.  At the time, Steel was one of the top U.S. clubs and Goldie remained with them until 1928.  Throughout his six seasons in Bethlehem, he was acknowledged as one of the top wingers in the ASL.  However, he suffered from numerous injuries which frequently put him on the sidelines for weeks at a time.  In 1926, Goldie and the Steelmen won the National Challenge Cup over the St. Louis Soccer League team Ben Millers with Goldie scoring one of Bethlehem's goals.  In 1927, Goldie added a league title to go with the Challenge Cup.  In August 1928, Bethlehem agreed to transfer Goldie to the Fall River Marksmen for $400.00, half to be paid immediately and half to be paid at a future date.  However, Fall River failed to pay the transfer amount as the league suspended Bethlehem Steel as part of the "Soccer Wars".  Goldie spent the 1928-1929 and 1929 fall season in Fall River.  However, he played only two games of the 1929–1930 season with them before moving to the Pawtucket Rangers.  He played fifteen games for Pawtucket before moving to the New Bedford Whalers for one game.

National team
Goldie earned one cap with the U.S. national team in a 6–1 win over Canada on 8 November 1925.

Coaching
In 1933, Goldie was hired as the head coach of the men's soccer team at MIT.  Goldie broke a vertebra in his back during the summer of 1940 which made it difficult for him to coach the team.  He ultimately retired and in April 1941, John Craig replaced him as head coach.

See also
List of United States men's international soccer players born outside the United States

External links
 Colin Jose profile
 National Soccer Hall of Fame eligibility profile
 MIT coaching profile

References

1883 births
Scottish footballers
Sportspeople from Clydebank
Footballers from West Dunbartonshire
Clydebank F.C. (1914) players
Clyde F.C. players
St Bernard's F.C. players
Scottish Football League players
Scottish emigrants to the United States
United States men's international soccer players
American Soccer League (1921–1933) players
Bethlehem Steel F.C. (1907–1930) players
Fall River Marksmen players
Pawtucket Rangers players
New Bedford Whalers players
American soccer coaches
Year of death missing
American soccer players
Association football forwards